Anses may refer to:

 ANSES (Administración Nacional de la Seguridad Social), Argentine social insurance agency
 Canton of Les Anses-d'Arlet, Martinique
 Les Anses-d'Arlet, a town in Martinique
 Anses of Saturn (plural of ansa), an early name for the handle-shaped protuberances on either side of the planet; see Eustachio Divini
 Agence nationale de sécurité sanitaire de l'alimentation, de l'environnement et du travail, a French governmental agency
 Æsir, Norse gods

See also 

 Anse (disambiguation)
Antes (name)